Château de Brieudet is a château in Saint-Estèphe, Dordogne, Nouvelle-Aquitaine, France.

Châteaux in Dordogne